Samantha Ceroni  (born 26 February 1973 in Ponte San Pietro) is an Italian former footballer who played as a midfielder for the Italy women's national football team. She was part of the team at the UEFA Women's Euro 2001. On club level she played for Ruco Line Lazio in Italy.

References

External links
 Football.it player profile

1973 births
Living people
Italian women's footballers
Italy women's international footballers
Women's association football midfielders
People from Ponte San Pietro
Sportspeople from the Province of Bergamo
Footballers from Lombardy
S.S. Lazio Women 2015 players
A.C.F. Brescia Calcio Femminile players
ACF Milan players
Atalanta Mozzanica Calcio Femminile Dilettantistico players
ASD Fiammamonza 1970 players
Torres Calcio Femminile players